Johann Kaspar Schiller (27 October 1723 – 7 September 1796) was an army officer and court gardener to the Dukes of Württemberg. He and his wife Elisabetha Dorothea are also notable as the parents of the playwright Friedrich Schiller.

Life 
He was born in 1723 at Bittenfeld to mayor Johannes Schiller (born 1682), whose ancestors were mainly vintners and craftsmen in Remstal, and his wife Eva Margarete Schatz (born 1690). He initially received private tuition in Latin until 1734. After four years' absence in 1738 he became an apprentice barber-surgeon in Denkendorf and Backnang.

He died in Solitude Palace and was buried on 9 September 1896 in the Petruskirche in Gerlingen.

Works 
 Betrachtungen über landwirthschaftliche Dinge in dem Herzogthum Würtemberg (= Oekonomische Beyträge zur Beförderung des bürgerlichen Wohlstandes. Bd. 1). Cotta, Stuttgart.
 1: Vom Ackerbau. 1767.
 2: Vom Weinbau. 1767.
 Vom Weinbau (= Weingeschichte. Bd. 1).
 3: Von der Viehezucht. 1767.
 4: Von der Baumzucht. 1768.
 5: Von ländlichen Gewerben. 1768.
 Die Baumzucht im Großen aus Zwanzigjährigen Erfahrungen im Kleinen in Rücksicht auf ihre Behandlung, Kosten, Nutzen und Ertrag beurtheilt. Hofbuchhandlung, Neustrelitz 1795.
 Ulmer, Stuttgart 1993, ISBN 3-8001-6514-7.

Bibliography 
  Peter Lahnstein: Schillers Leben. Biographie. Neuausgabe. List, München 1990, ISBN 3-471-78050-5.
  Friedrich Pfäfflin, Eva Dambacher: Schiller. Ständige Ausstellung des Schiller-Nationalmuseums und des deutschen Literaturarchivs Marbach am Neckar (= Marbacher Kataloge. , Bd. 32). 3., durchgesehene Auflage. Deutsche Schiller-Gesellschaft, Marbach am Neckar 2001.
  Constant Wurzbach von Tannenberg: Das Schiller-Buch. Festgabe zur ersten Säcular-Feier von Schiller’s Geburt 1859. Kaiserlich-Königliche Hof- und Staatsdruckerei, Wien 1859.

External links 
 
  Bittenfeld und die Schiller on the private website for Bittenfeld
  Letters from Friedrich Schiller to his parents in the Friedrich Schiller archive
  Biography (Gesellschaft für Geschichte des Weines)

References 

1723 births
1796 deaths
18th-century gardeners
German gardeners
German farmers
18th-century botanists
German military doctors
People from the Duchy of Württemberg
Friedrich Schiller